The History of an Artist, Vol. 2 is a 1972 studio album by Oscar Peterson, the second of two albums so titled to provide a retrospective of his career. 

The History of an Artist series marked Peterson's first recordings for Norman Granz' new record label, Pablo Records. Peterson had previously recorded for Granz' three former labels, and would remain with Pablo until the mid-1980s.

Track listing
 "Wes' Tune" (Wes Montgomery) – 6:37
 "Reunion Blues" (Milt Jackson) – 8:50
 "When Your Lover Has Gone" (Einar Aaron Swan) – 7:20
 "Five O'Clock Whistle" (Kim Gannon, Gene Irwin, Josef Myrow) – 4:07
 "Old Folks" (Dedette Lee Hill, Willard Robison) – 4:43
 "Ma (He's Making Eyes at Me)" (Sidney Clare, Con Conrad) – 4:20
 "Tenderly" (Walter Gross, Jack Lawrence) – 9:28

Personnel
 Oscar Peterson - piano
 Herb Ellis - guitar
 Barney Kessel - guitar
 Ray Brown - double bass
 George Mraz - double bass
 Niels-Henning Ørsted Pedersen - double bass
 Sam Jones - double bass
 Bobby Durham - drums

References

Albums produced by Norman Granz
1972 compilation albums
Oscar Peterson compilation albums
Pablo Records compilation albums